Sidney Willard (September 19, 1780 – December 6, 1856) was an American academic and politician who served in the Massachusetts House of Representatives, on the Massachusetts Governor's Council and as the second Mayor of Cambridge, Massachusetts.

Willard was the Librarian of Harvard from 1800 to 1805. From 1807 to 1831 he was the Hancock Professor of Hebrew and other Oriental Languages at Harvard College. Willard was elected a Fellow of the American Academy of Arts and Sciences in 1808.

Willard was the son of Harvard president Joseph Willard and Mary (Sheafe) Willard.

Willard was a member of the Anthology Club, and a founder of The Literary Miscellany, established and edited the American Monthly Review (4 vols., 1832/3), was editor of The Christian Register, contributed to numerous periodicals, and published a Hebrew Grammar (Cambridge, 1817), and Memoirs of Youth and Manhood (2 vols., 1855).

His son in law, John Bartlett, was an American writer and publisher whose best known work, Bartlett's Familiar Quotations, has been continually revised and reissued for a century after his death.

References

1780 births
1856 deaths
People from Beverly, Massachusetts
Members of the Massachusetts House of Representatives
Members of the Massachusetts Governor's Council
Harvard University librarians
Harvard College faculty
Mayors of Cambridge, Massachusetts
19th-century American politicians
Linguists from the United States
Fellows of the American Academy of Arts and Sciences
Harvard College alumni